Tatiana Sakharova (Russian: Татьяна Анатольевна Сахарова; born 16 June 1973) is a Russian politician serving as a senator from the Murmansk Oblast Duma since 7 October 2021.

Tatiana Sakharova is under personal sanctions introduced by the European Union, the United Kingdom, the USA, Canada, Switzerland, Australia, Ukraine, New Zealand, for ratifying the decisions of the "Treaty of Friendship, Cooperation and Mutual Assistance between the Russian Federation and the Donetsk People's Republic and between the Russian Federation and the Luhansk People's Republic" and providing political and economic support for Russia's annexation of Ukrainian territories.

Biography

Tatiana Sakharova was born on 16 June 1973 in Donetsk. In 1995, she graduated from the Saint Petersburg State University of Economics. From 1996 to 2012, she worked as Head of the Legal Entities Service Sector at the Murmansk branch of Sberbank. From 2015 to 2021, she was the deputy Deputy Chairman of the Council of Deputies in Severomorsk. In December 2019, Sakharova was appointed Head of the regional branch of the United Russia party. On 7 October 2021, he became the senator from the Murmansk Oblast Duma.

References

Living people
1973 births
United Russia politicians
21st-century Russian politicians
People from Donetsk
Members of the Federation Council of Russia (after 2000)